Chromium is a 2015 Albanian drama film directed by Bujar Alimani. It was selected as the Albanian entry for the Best Foreign Language Film at the 89th Academy Awards but it was not nominated.

Cast
 Frefjon Ruci
 Klodjana Keco
 Mirela Naska
 Kasem Hoxha

See also
 List of submissions to the 89th Academy Awards for Best Foreign Language Film
 List of Albanian submissions for the Academy Award for Best Foreign Language Film

References

External links
 

2015 films
2015 drama films
Albanian drama films
Albanian-language films